Kyle Rankin (born September 13, 1972) is an American screenwriter and filmmaker known for directing The Battle of Shaker Heights, Night of the Living Deb, and Run Hide Fight.

Early life and education
Rankin was born in Danbury, Connecticut and attended the University of Maine, where he founded the UMaine Film & Video Club. As a college student, Rankin was the star and co-producer of a soap opera on campus called DORM, which was eventually released statewide (through Home Vision Video) with the episodes compiled into one feature-length film.

Career 
Kyle co-directed The Battle of Shaker Heights through the second season of HBO's Project Greenlight. He wrote and directed a movie produced by Icon Productions, called Infestation, starring Chris Marquette, Ray Wise, Brooke Nevin; it was shot in the summer of 2007 in Bulgaria. He created the feature/web-series Nuclear Family (2011), and the indie features Night of the Living Deb (2015) and The Witch Files (2017). Run Hide Fight (2020) was filmed in Red Oak, Texas in the fall of 2019 and stars Isabel May, Thomas Jane, and Radha Mitchell.

Personal life
Rankin lives in Los Angeles with his wife and three children.

Filmography
Run Hide Fight (2021)
The Witch Files (2017)
Night of the Living Deb (2015)
Nuclear Family (2011)
Exhibit B-5 (2010)
Infestation (2009)
Hellholes (Internet film) (2006)
Insex (short film) (2006)
The Battle of Shaker Heights (2003)
Alias: The Lost Episode (2002)
They Came to Attack Us (2001)
Pennyweight (1999)
The Girl in the Basement (1997) (Formerly known as "Reindeer Games")
Dorm (1995)

References

External links
 Official Kyle Rankin website

1972 births
Living people
People from Danbury, Connecticut
English-language film directors
Film directors from Connecticut
Film directors from Maine
Participants in American reality television series
University of Maine alumni